Mauritania Airlines previously Mauritania Airlines International, is an airline based in Nouakchott, Mauritania, serving as flag carrier of the country. The company was set up in December 2010 in response to the demise of Mauritania Airways. In April 2018, it was announced the airline had rebranded from Mauritania Airlines International to Mauritania Airlines. It is also the only airline so far operating in Mauritania.

Destinations
Mauritania Airlines has its base at Nouakchott–Oumtounsy International Airport (NKC). The company operates short- and medium-haul flights. Short-haul flights are mainly national connections between the Mauritanian airports and some flights to other West African countries.

Africa
Mauritania
Nouadhibou – Nouadhibou International Airport
Nouakchott – Nouakchott–Oumtounsy International Airport, hub
Zouérat – Tazadit Airport
Benin
Cotonou – Cadjehoun Airport
Republic of the Congo
Brazzaville – Maya-Maya Airport
Pointe Noire
Côte d'Ivoire
Abidjan – Port Bouet Airport
Guinea
Conakry – Conakry International Airport
Mali
Bamako – Bamako-Sénou International Airport
Tunisia
Tunis – Tunis–Carthage International Airport
Morocco
Casablanca – Mohammed V International Airport
Senegal
Dakar – Blaise Diagne International Airport
Sierra Leone
Freetown – Lungi International Airport

Europe

The airline was on the EU "blacklist" until December 2012, but it has since been removed.

Spain
Las Palmas de Gran Canaria – Gran Canaria Airport

Fleet

Current fleet
As of January 2023, the Mauritania Airlines fleet consists of the following aircraft:

Former fleet
The airline previously operated the following aircraft (as of August 2017):
 2 Boeing 737-500

See also		
 List of defunct airlines of Mauritania

References

External links 

 

Airlines of Mauritania
Airlines established in 2010
Airlines formerly banned in the European Union
2010 establishments in Africa